Jean Favard (28 August 190221 January 1965) was a French mathematician who worked on analysis.

Favard was born in Peyrat-la-Nonière.  During World War II he was a prisoner of war in Germany.

He also was a President of the French Mathematical Society in 1946.  He died in La Tronche, aged 62.

See also
 Favard measure (see )
 Bohr-Favard inequality (see )
 Favard inequality (see )
 Favard constant
 Favard–Akhiezer–Krein theorem
 Favard interpolation  
 Favard theorem
 Favard problem (see )
 Favard operators

External links
COMITE DES AMIS DE JEAN-FAVARD
The Lycée Jean Favard is named after him.
Here Favard is mentioned as a prisoner of war.

1902 births
1965 deaths
Mathematical analysts
20th-century French mathematicians